Jon Hawkins is an American politician from Utah. He currently serves as the representative for Utah House District 57. During the 2022 General Session, he served on the Higher Education Appropriations Subcommittee, House Business and Labor Committee, House Ethics Committee, House Judiciary Committee, and Occupational and Professional Licensure Review Committee.

Education and biographical information
Hawkins earned his BA in communications and his MBA from Brigham Young University. He currently works in Software Sales and Workfront. Hawkins served on the Pleasant Grove Planing Commission from 2016 to 2018, and has previously served as a Boy Scout leader and youth sports coach.

In January 2021, Hawkins was hospitalized with COVID-19. He was intubated and underwent tracheotomy. He was released from the hospital in March.

2022 sponsored legislation

References

External links
Official page at the Utah State Legislature
Campaign site
Jon Hawkins at Ballotpedia
Jon Hawkins at the National Institute on Money in State Politics

Living people
Republican Party members of the Utah House of Representatives
Brigham Young University alumni
Politicians from Orem, Utah
Year of birth missing (living people)